The Qingli Reforms or Qingli New Deal, or Qingli New Policies, also called Minor Reforms (小改革), took place in China’s Song dynasty under the leadership of Fan Zhongyan and Ouyang Xiu. Taking place from 1043 to 1045 and so called for falling in the 1041-1048 era of the same name, it was a short-lived attempt to introduce reforms into the traditional way of conducting governmental affairs in China.  It was a precursor to a grander effort three decades later led by Wang Anshi.

Qingli Reforms was the first political reform of the Northern Song Dynasty, which lasted for one year and four months, eventually ended in failure. After the failure of the reform, Fan Zhongyan was deported to Dengzhou.

Fan Zhongyan

Fan Zhongyan was prefect of Kaifeng, the imperial capital during the Northern Song era, in the 1030s.  However, he was demoted to regional posts for criticizing the Chief Councillor.  In 1040, the Liao and Western Xia to the north threatened Song security.  Fan was brought back to organize a strong defense.

Ouyang Xiu

Ouyang Xiu was posted to Kaifeng four years after passing his jinshi examination in 1030.  He began his association with Fan from this time in Kaifeng.  Like Fan, he also was demoted.  After Fan's demotion, Ouyang criticized Fan's principle critic, resulting in being sent to a minor post in Hubei.  Like Fan, he was brought back to the capital in the 1040s where he was assigned to work on cataloguing the entire imperial library.

Ten-Point Memorial

Fan Zhongyan submitted a ten-point memorial in which he outlined his reform objectives.  They can be divided into three categories:

 Administrative efficiency 
 Strengthen local governments
 Strengthen defense

Implementation

The first measure undertaken was to allow competent officials to stay in one post for more than three years and for unable or treacherous officials to be removed more easily. Sons and relatives of state officials were banned from automatically inheriting the post of their father. The importance of poetry in the imperial examinations was reduced in favour of essays and the Confucian classics. Supervision over officials in the provinces responsible for the transport of tax grains was increased and appointed directly by the central government. Land allotted to officials was redistributed more adequately. Agricultural productivity was enhanced by the construction of dykes and canals to improve irrigation. Troops garrisoned around the capital was to engage in agriculture and be trained in a more effective way. Service corvée was to be reduced. Proclamations and edicts issued by the court were to be followed by imminent implementation, with an greater control over their implementation.

Many of these reforms were put into effect in the two-year period from 1043 to 1045.  However, without the full support of the emperor, there never was complete implementation of the reforms. Not long after they began, backlash from groups of officials, large land owners, and the wealthy in general resulted in the dismissal Fan Zhongyan and Fu Bi in 1045.

The Imperial University was created as part of the reforms for the education of the children of commoners and low-ranking officials. It was the only institution that survived the reversal of the reforms.

Legacy
Wang Anshi would take up the banner of reform in the 1070s, not only pushing for many of the Qingli Reforms, but going even further.  However, while they remained in place longer than the Qingli Reforms, with the exception of some reforms to the examination system, this reform effort similarly met a dead end.

See also
New Policies (Song dynasty)

References

Further reading
  
 
 

Song dynasty politics
Reform in China